"Bad Romance" is a song by American singer Lady Gaga from her third extended play (EP), The Fame Monster (2009)—the reissue of her debut studio album, The Fame (2008). Gaga wrote and produced the song with RedOne. Following an illegal demo leak, Gaga premiered the song's final version during the finale of Alexander McQueen's 2010 Paris Fashion Week show in October 2009 and released it as the lead single from The Fame Monster later that month. Musically, it is an electropop and dance-pop song with a spoken bridge. Inspired by German house and techno, the song was developed as an experimental pop record. Lyrically, Gaga drew from the paranoia she experienced while on tour and wrote about her attraction to unhealthy romantic relationships.

"Bad Romance" was acclaimed by music critics for its chorus, beat and hook. Retrospective reviewers called it Gaga's best song. It topped the charts in more than 20 countries and sold 12 million copies worldwide, becoming one of the best-selling singles of all time. In the US, the song peaked at number two on the Billboard Hot 100 chart and was certified eleven times Platinum by the Recording Industry Association of America, having sold 5.9 million digital downloads as of 2019. "Bad Romance" won a Grammy Award for Best Female Pop Vocal Performance, and was included in annual "best-of" lists of the media outlets Rolling Stone and Pitchfork;  the former named it one of the 100 Greatest Songs of the 21st Century and 500 Greatest Songs of All Time. In a 2017 journal, which studied structural patterns in melodies of earworm songs, American Psychological Association called "Bad Romance" the catchiest in the world.

The music video for "Bad Romance", directed by Francis Lawrence, features Gaga inside a surreal white bathhouse where she is kidnapped and drugged by supermodels who sell her to the Russian mafia for sexual slavery. The video ends as Gaga immolates the man who bought her. It garnered acclaim from critics for its fashion, choreography, costumes and symbolism. Briefly becoming the most-viewed YouTube video in 2010, it received a record ten nominations at the MTV Video Music Awards, winning seven, including Video of the Year. It received the Grammy Award for Best Music Video and was named the best music video of the 21st century by Billboard. Gaga has performed "Bad Romance" at television shows, award ceremonies, her concert tours and residency shows, and the Super Bowl LI halftime show.

Background and release

Lady Gaga and RedOne wrote, produced and arranged "Bad Romance"; they were also responsible for background vocals. RedOne solely handled instrumentation, programming and recording. He worked with Johny Severin on vocal editing, and Dave Russell and Eelco Bakker on audio engineering. The song was mixed by Spike Stent and mastered by Gene Grimaldi. "Bad Romance" was recorded at the Record Plant in Los Angeles and FC Walvisch in Amsterdam.

Before its official release, a demo version was published illegally on the internet on October 2, 2009, prompting Gaga to comment via Twitter that it "is makin[g] my ears bleed. Wait till you hear the real version." Gaga performed a snippet of "Bad Romance" on Saturday Night Live on October 3, 2009, along with "Poker Face" and "LoveGame". The song's final version premiered during the finale of Alexander McQueen's 2010 Paris Fashion Week show titled Plato's Atlantis, which was his last work before his death a few months later. On October 19, "Bad Romance" was released as the lead single from the extended play (EP) The Fame Monster (2009), the reissue of Gaga's debut studio album, The Fame (2008).

"Bad Romance" was one of the songs Gaga wrote in 2009 while touring. These songs were about the various abstract "monsters"—metaphors for her paranoias—she faced during the tour. Gaga explained that she generally felt lonely in her relationships and was attracted to unhealthy romances, which became the song's themes. Gaga wrote the lyrics in Norway on her tour bus. She elaborated on the writing process in an interview with Grazia:

I was in Russia, then Germany, and spent a lot of time in Eastern Europe. There is this amazing German house-techno music, so I wanted to make a pop experimental record. I kind of wanted to leave the '80s a little bit, so the chorus is a '90s melody, which is what the inspiration was. There was certainly some whisky involved in the writing of the record. It's about being in love with your best friend.

Music and lyrics
"Bad Romance" is an electropop and dance-pop song with house, new wave and techno influences. Sociologist Mathieu Deflem recognized rock influences in the song. BBC critic Paul Lester noted rave-inspired synthesizer sounds in the song. According to the sheet music on Musicnotes.com, the song is set in common time with a metronome of 119 beats per minute. It is composed in the key of A minor; Gaga's vocal range spans from the low-note of E3 to the high-note of C5. The song follows in the chord progression of Am–C–F–C–G in the verses and F–G–Am–C–F–G–E–Am in the chorus.

Describing Gaga's voice in "Bad Romance", Deflem wrote that it is "at times raw and raspy, not soft and smooth, and incorporates the contrast of gentle and harsh vocal styles, alternating singing softly with screaming loudly". The song opens as Gaga sings a portion of the chorus, then transitions into the "Rah-rah—ah-ah-ah, Roma-roma-ma, Gaga-ooh-la-la" hook, which she says is an abbreviation of the word "romance". The song then incorporates keyboard sounds. They are followed by the first verse and the pre-chorus as Gaga voices the lines, "You know that I want you / And you know that I need you". The "full-throated" chorus follows, where she sings, "You and me could write a bad romance ... / Caught in a bad romance."

Critics noted the influence of others songs and artists on "Bad Romance". Sal Cinquemani of Slant Magazine noticed influences from 1980s music. Simon Price from The Independent and Daniel Brockman of The Phoenix compared the song to works of the groups Boney M. and Depeche Mode, respectively. In the verse, "I want your psycho, your vertigo shtick, Want you in my Rear Window, Baby, you're sick", Gaga is listing Alfred Hitchcock films. She said, "What I'm really trying to say is I want the deepest, darkest, sickest parts of you that you are afraid to share with anyone because I love you that much." Price stated that the line "I want your ugly, I want your disease" established the grim tone of The Fame Monster.

The lyrics address a bad relationship; the Boston Public Health Commission included "Bad Romance" in its "Top 10 List of Songs with Unhealthy Relationship Ingredients". For Brockman, the song is a declaration of "liberation from a significant other". Explaining its title, author Robin James in the book Resilience & Melancholy: Pop Music, Feminism, Neoliberalism wrote it does not romanticize "bad" things but is only "pointing out the badness of conventionally-scripted pop song 'romance' itself".

Katrin Horn, a postdoctoral fellow in American studies, found that "Bad Romance" works on two levels. As the gay and lesbian youth account for a large proportion of Gaga's fans, the line "I don't wanna be friends"—which explores the issue of falling in love with one's heterosexual best friend—resonates with them. On the other hand, the song thematizes Gaga's "bad romance" with fame and fortune. Horn interpreted the part "all your lovers' revenge" as Gaga referencing her fans' previous idols, and in the line "I want your love", she is seeking applause from her fans when performing live.

Critical reception
"Bad Romance" received widespread critical acclaim. It was named the best song on The Fame Monster by Maureen Lee Lanker of Entertainment Weekly. It was included in lists of best songs of 2009 by Pitchfork—which called it "epic in construction"—MTV News and Rolling Stone. Calling it one of the "most memorable pop singles" of the late 2000s, NME credits the song with establishing Gaga as an icon. In his review of the album, Scott Plagenhoef of Pitchfork found it "arguably the best pop single" of 2009.

"Bad Romance" was praised for its chorus, beat and hook. Kaufman lauded the drastic transition into a bombastic beat during the chorus, which was called catchy by Rolling Stone Jody Rosen, one of Gaga's best by
MusicOMH Michael Hubbard and "so wonderfully big it dwarfs the industry of a million angry dudes with guitars" by NME Emily Mackay. Christopher John Farley from The Wall Street Journal praised the "Jabberwockian" catchiness of the hook. Other reviewers commented on the song's sex appeal, praised it for making Gaga's name a "Teutonic chant", and called it a "turbocharged Euro-soul" and a club-friendly tune that possessed a "sordid underbelly".

"Bad Romance" was compared to Gaga's previous singles (including "Just Dance" and "Poker Face") by reviewers, with the criticism that it was not on par with them and lacked their instant catch. Critics compared Gaga to other artists. Kitty Empire of The Guardian wrote "Bad Romance" made "this driven, uncharismatic Italian-American being [Gaga] the new Madonna", and Spin Josh Modell thought that with its "earworm nonsense lyric ('[r]a-ra-a-a-a, ra-ma, uh-uh-ah!')", the song "plays like the best Madonna song in ages". Jon Blistein from L Magazine believed it is an amalgamation of a Cher song, "faux-European accented verse" and "bland spoken-word bridge".

Chart performance
In the US, "Bad Romance" debuted at number nine on the Billboard Hot 100 on November 14, 2009, with 143,000digital downloads. After two weeks, the song reached number two, holding the spot for seven non-consecutive weeks. It was barred from the top position by Jay-Z's "Empire State of Mind" (featuring Alicia Keys) and later Kesha's "Tik Tok" (both 2009). The movement to number two was first prompted by a 49% digital gain, which led to the song's top spot on the Hot Digital Songs chart. As of February 2019, "Bad Romance" has sold 5.9 million copies in the US, according to Nielsen Soundscan, making Gaga the second artist after Katy Perry to have three singles—along with "Just Dance" and "Poker Face"—each sell five million digital copies. After the Recording Industry Association of America (RIAA) started including video streams in their tabulation of the single certifications, "Bad Romance" was certified 11× platinum for 11million in sales and streaming. According to Nielsen Broadcast Data Systems, it briefly set the record for most weekly plays in the 17-year history of the Pop Songs chart, registering 10,859plays from 130radio stations monitored for the chart. Following Gaga's Super Bowl LI halftime show performance in 2017, "Bad Romance" re-entered the Hot 100 at number 50 and Digital Song Sales at number 9. On the Canadian Hot 100, "Bad Romance" debuted at number 58, and reached number one the following week. Replaced by "Tik Tok" for two weeks, "Bad Romance" returned to the top spot on the chart. Music Canada certified "Bad Romance" septuple platinum, denoting download sales of 280,000copies.

On the European Hot 100 Singles chart, "Bad Romance" spent two weeks at number one. It topped the charts in Austria, Denmark, Finland, Germany, Ireland, Sweden and Norway. In the UK, "Bad Romance" debuted at number 14 on the UK Singles Chart. In December 2009, the song reached the top spot with 72,919copies sold, making Gaga the first female artist to have three number-one singles in one year. It attained multi-platinum certification by the British Phonographic Industry (BPI). According to the British company Phonographic Performance Limited, the song was the UK's most played in 2010. As of July2022, "Bad Romance" has sold 1.7million copies with 84million streams, making it Gaga's third best selling single in the UK.

"Bad Romance" debuted at number 16 on the ARIA Singles Chart in Australia and at number 33 on the RIANZ Singles Chart in New Zealand. The song was certified quadruple platinum by the Australian Recording Industry Association for shipment of 280,000copies. The song sold 9.7 million copies worldwide in 2010—making it the second best-selling of the year—and 12million as of 2018, becoming one of the best-selling singles of all time.

Music video

Development

In an interview with Rolling Stone, Gaga confirmed Francis Lawrence as the director of the music video and said that she was impressed with the final version. She explained, "I knew [Lawrence's] ability as a director is so much higher than what I could [do]." Her creative team Haus of Gaga managed the art direction, and the final video premiered on November 10, 2009. Gaga described her experience of working with Lawrence:

I wanted somebody with a tremendous understanding of how to make a pop video, because my biggest challenge working with directors is that I am the director and I write the treatments and I get the fashion and I decide what it's about and it's very hard to find directors that will relinquish any sort of input from the artist ... But Francis and I worked together ... It was collaborative. He's a really pop video director and a filmmaker ... I knew he could execute the video in a way that I could give him all my weirdest, most psychotic ideas ... But it would come across to and be relevant to the public.

Gaga and Lawrence developed the music video's concept. It was initially planned to be shot in New York City, with more elaborate sets and outdoor space. Owing to the low budget and a lack of product placement, this idea was scrapped. Because of Gaga's schedule, it was shot in Los Angeles over a two-day period. Lawrence was impressed with Gaga's work ethic and creativity during the video shoot; he praised her teamwork, punctuality and spontaneity.

Synopsis

The video's main idea is that Gaga gets kidnapped by supermodels who drug her and sell her to the Russian mafia for a million rubles. It takes place in a fluorescent white bathhouse. The video begins as Gaga, wearing razor-blade glasses, sits on a white throne in a brightly-lit white room while Johann Sebastian Bach's "Fugue No. 24" is playing in the background. As she plays "Bad Romance" on an iPod speaker, a dimly-lit bathhouse is shown, which has a sign reading "Bath Haus of GaGa" on its walls. As the song's first hook begins, Gaga and other women in latex suits crawl out of white, coffin-like pods, and begin dancing. A pastiche of ensuing scenes alternates between Gaga singing to herself in front of a mirror and lying in a bathtub.

During the chorus, two women pull Gaga out of the bathtub, rip her top clothing off and force her to drink a glass of vodka. As the second verse begins, Gaga, wearing a diamond-covered outfit and crown, seductively dances for men bidding for her. She performs a lap dance for one of them (played by Slovenian model Jurij Bradač), who becomes her highest bidder. When the chorus plays for the third time, Gaga is shown wearing a faux-polar bear hide jacket and walking toward the man, who is sitting on a bed and unbuttoning his shirt. Looking indifferent, she removes her jacket and sunglasses. The bed spontaneously combusts while he is still sitting on it, and Gaga sings sinisterly in front of the flames. The video ends as she lies beside a smoldering skeleton on top of the destroyed bed covered in ashes. With soot smeared across her body, she calmly smokes a cigarette as her pyrotechnic bra activates.

Reception
The video received general acclaim for its fashion, choreography, futuristic set-piece and costumes. Gaga, described by Christopher John Farley of The Wall Street Journal as "one of the few pop stars of the present time who really understood spectacle, fashion, shock, choreography" like Madonna and Michael Jackson in the 1980s, was particularly praised by Jennifer Cady of E! for revitalizing performance art and putting thoughts and care into her products; Todd Martens of the Los Angeles Times expressed similar sentiments, believing the video to be "worthy of a feature-length film". Critics positively commented on her looks, as they found her minimal use of make-up and the appearance of a "stripped down" and "real" Gaga refreshing.

Media outlets noted the music video was reminiscent of the film Blade Runner (1982), Anubis Airlines from the television series True Blood (2008–2014), the works of filmmaker Stanley Kubrick and Michael Jackson's Thriller. The comparison to the lattermost was made because of the scene with the coffin pods, "twitchy [...] dance moves", and zombie-like arm movements. Farley thought the video's shock art resembled Jackson's work during the 1980s. For Evan Sawdey of PopMatters, it remained unclear whether Gaga deliberately paid homage to Thriller or used this as another excuse to wear "the  outfits ever designed by mankind".

Thematic analysis
Gaga said that the human trafficking in the video is a metaphor for the music industry's treatment of women as a "commodity". In the book Lady Gaga: Behind the Fame, Emily Herbert drew comparisons between the underlying theme of the video and the theme of The Fame Monster—Gaga's relationship with fame. Herbert wrote, "Was this the price that Gaga had to pay for the fame she so desired? Did she feel as if she'd had to prostitute herself in some way? The themes were all based around sex, decadence, and corruption; alcohol and even cigarettes, twenty-first century society's biggest no-no, were present, and so by implication ... drugs."

Jocelyn Vena from MTV News and Troy Peterson of Slate believed that the video was symbolic. As it begins with Gaga around people representing her characters from The Fame videos, she is immediately kidnapped, drugged and changed into "the super-sexy, somewhat spooky Fame Monster version". Vena interpreted this as Gaga reinventing her image and being someone who likes to "push the boundaries and explor[e] all manner of sexual proclivities". She felt that the video was a testament to Gaga's brilliance as an artist who uses her videos to visualize the start of her career's next phase. Peterson found religious symbolism in the video. He believed, for example, that the scenes with Gaga in the bathtub represented baptism and the women with martini were performing communion.

The video's style, fashion and items were subject to analysis. The pair of razor-blade sunglasses that Gaga wore portrayed tough female spirit; she explained, "It's meant to be, 'This is my shield, this is my weapon, this is my inner sense of fame, this is my monster." Author Robin James found Gaga's style in the video to be heavily inspired by goth fashion and aesthetics, including the Victorian-esque furniture and razor-blade eyeglasses. By visualizing "goth monstrosity", Gaga showcases sexual norms and identities to display the struggle she overcomes. For example, the words "Bath Haus of GaGa" in the video allude to English goth band Bauhaus, and her nude scene highlights her thin body's "grotesqueness" and vertebrae, which look like the ridges on a reptile's back. James associated the "disgusting, distorted, monstrous bodies and movements" with the sexism Gaga faces. She described the video as Gaga's "conquest of the male gaze, the traffic in women and rape culture", which she felt was highlighted in Gaga's "insect" suit with Alexander McQueen's  armadillo heels resembling lobster-claws—a reference to a female mantis who cannibalizes her male partner after copulation. Mass media theorist Paul Hegarty saw Gaga's use of the heels as a combination of dominance and submission: their height restricts her movement, indicating submissiveness, but her ability to walk in them signifies a subversive dominance. In this way, the video "looks at complicity with controls as a way of surmounting them".

Critics analyzed the ending scene, in which Gaga defeats the villain. Gaga kills her captor using a sparkling, pyrotechnic bra after having had sex with him. According to Mathieu Deflem, the bra represents Gaga's thoughts on society perceiving female breasts as a "weapon" when they are simply part of a woman's body. Author Annette Lynch found the bra a symbol for empowerment, writing that Gaga uses her sexuality to defeat the villain. During this scene, Gaga is seen calmly smoking a cigarette, which to Gilad Padva in the Journal of LGBT Youth indicated that she liked the sexual encounter with her captor, who dies after being exploited by a "voracious" Gaga—an "unruly woman" prioritizing her own satisfaction over attempting to please her male partner. Padva found that this comically reversed "hegemonic [hetro]sexuality", where the submissive and exploited is now dominating and exploiting. In the book The Performance Identities of Lady Gaga: Critical Essays, Jennifer M. Santos believed by overpowering her captor, Gaga redefined gender roles and subverted male fantasies of "fetishistic scopophilia" and "sadistic voyeurism" as evident in the scene where Gaga is forced to strip almost naked and dance for her buyers.

Accolades and impact

In 2011, "Bad Romance" won the Grammy Award for Best Female Pop Vocal Performance. In 2015, Billboard called the song "the Biggest Hot 100 Hit to Peak at No. 2", describing it as a "modern classic". A 2017 journal published by Psychology of Aesthetics, Creativity, and the Arts studying structural patterns in the melodies of earworm songs compiled lists of catchiest tracks from 3,000participants, in which "Bad Romance" ranked number one. In 2018 and 2021, Rolling Stone named "Bad Romance" one of the 100 Greatest Songs of the 21st Centry and 500 Greatest Songs of All Time, respectively. The following year, Billboard listed it as one of the "100 Best Karaoke Songs of All Time".

Media outlets Belfast Telegraph, Rolling Stone, Billboard, The Guardian, The Independent, Vulture, Uproxx and Glamour ranked "Bad Romance" as Gaga's best song. For Vulture, it defined the late 2000s and "completed her transformation into a truly fearless, all-encompassing artist". Rolling Stone believed the song epitomized the "essence of Gagaism" and Billboard opined it captured "her grandiose aesthetic, daring songwriting, lyrical flourishes and dramatic vocal flair". According to Uproxx, the song had elements that influenced Gaga's later work—"pure pop melodies, nods to her love for '80s and '90s dance, pop culture references [...] a radio-friendly chorus that sticks on the charts like honey, and a hefty dose of 'WTF' weirdness that keeps the singer in her own lane". Author Constantine Chatzipapatheodoridis cited "Bad Romance" as one of the signature songs on The Fame Monster, in which Gaga immersed in "her stylized profile of the 'mad artist, who challenged traditional gender norms and sexuality.

In May 2010, "Bad Romance" became the first video to reach 200million views on YouTube, briefly becoming the most-viewed video there. In January 2019, the video reached 1 billion views. It received 10 nominations at the 2010 MTV Video Music Awards, including Best Art Direction, Best Special Effects and Best Cinematography, winning Video of the Year, Best Female Video, Best Pop Video, Best Dance Video, Best Direction, Best Editing and Best Choreography. It tied with Peter Gabriel's "Sledgehammer" for the record of most nominations for a single video in the history of the MTV Video Music Award. "Bad Romance" received the Grammy Award for Best Short Form Music Video. Time magazine included "Bad Romance" on its list of best music videos since the 1980s. Its author Claire Suddath said that even if Gaga's subsequent videos were more elaborate, "Bad Romance" was Gaga at her best.

Writing about the impact of Gaga's 2011 song "Born This Way" in the 2010s, Stephen Daw of Billboard called the "Bad Romance" music video a "culture-breaking moment". In 2011, it was voted the best video of the 2000s by readers of Billboard, narrowly beating Britney Spears's "Toxic". The magazine ranked it first in its list of 100 greatest music videos of the 21st century and credited it with establishing Gaga's fan base, known as Little Monsters. "It offered a glimpse into an entire cinematic world that thrilled and disturbed in equal measure, expanding the possibilities of what a music video could achieve — and challenging other stars to step their game up at the same time", wrote Billboard in its listing. "With 'Bad Romance,' she took the old standard for great music videos and set it aflame, then got to work building a new one." In 2021, Rolling Stone Australia listed it as one of the 100 greatest music videos of all time.

Live performances

Gaga first performed "Bad Romance" on Saturday Night Live in October 2009. She wore an outfit called "The Orb". In an interview with MTV, Gaga explained that she did not want the performance to be out of tune with the show's storyline, so she worked with the scriptwriters to incorporate it into the plot. Occurring at a private party arranged by the character Blair Waldorf, the episode features Gaga as she emerges from two giant doors and climbs up a ladder, which symbolizes bad luck.

Gaga performed "Bad Romance" at the 2009 American Music Awards. She was dressed in a flesh-colored bodysuit wrapped with white piping and embedded with flashing lights, imitating rib cage and a spine. During her performance, she broke open a glass door with the microphone stand. Gaga sang the song on television shows, including The Jay Leno Show in November 2009, The Ellen DeGeneres Show in November 2009, The X Factor in December 2009, The Oprah Winfrey Show in January 2010, and Today in July 2010. In May 2011, she performed it at Radio 1's Big Weekend in Carlisle, Cumbria and Good Morning America. For the latter, she entered the stage flying on a harness as steam billowed from center-stage. As the song started, she changed to red fishnet stockings with black felt pieces, a red leotard and black lace boots. Katie Kindelan of ABC News commented on Gaga's "trademark outrageous fashion".

"Bad Romance" was the last song in the set list of Gaga's worldwide concert series, The Monster Ball Tour (2009–2011). On the early version of the show, she wore a 1980s-inspired white power suit with high shoulders and high-waisted pants. In the revamped 2010–2011 shows of the tour, she appeared on stage inside a gyroscope while wearing a mirrored dress and headpiece. Remarking on Gaga's "tremendous ambition and passion for her fans", Diana Benati of The Riverfront Times wrote, "Few people on this little blue marble have the ability or the opportunity to affect so many people on a daily basis. She stole[...] hearts". Gaga emerged from an egg for the performance of "Bad Romance" at the Born This Way Ball (2012–2013). Miguel Dumaual of ABS-CBNnews.com felt Gaga's performance "suffers from a little too much auto-dancing, -singing, and all-around hip gyrating". Gaga also performed the track on her 2014 ArtRave: The Artpop Ball tour in a rave-inspired outfit. The same year, she sang a country version of "Bad Romance" at South by Southwest, and strapped on a rose-covered keytar while performing the song at her residency show, Lady Gaga Live at Roseland Ballroom. 

In July2016, Gaga performed it in a piano medley along with "You and I" and the Beatles' "Come Together" at a concert at the BB&T Pavilion in Camden, New Jersey, which was part of the 2016 Democratic National Convention. In November2016, she appeared in the Carpool Karaoke segment of The Late Late Show with James Corden, and sang the track in the car with its host. Gaga closed her set at the Super Bowl LI halftime show with "Bad Romance", wearing a silver, sequined Versace outfit with a shoulder pad-inspired jacket and hot pants. The song was performed alongside "Poker Face" as an encore during both weekends that Gaga headlined Coachella in 2017. On the Joanne World Tour (2017–2018), Gaga performed "Bad Romance" wearing a white origami-like jacket and a crystal embellished bodysuit with a matching white feathery masquerade mask and Giuseppe Zanotti booties. She did a piano rendition of the song at the 2017 Toronto International Film Festival, before the world premiere of her documentary, Gaga: Five Foot Two. 

Gaga sang "Bad Romance" during her residency show, Lady Gaga Enigma + Jazz & Piano (2018–2022), which was divided into two shows. On Enigma, she performed it in a champagne-hued gold outfit, and on Jazz & Piano, she did a stripped-down version. "Bad Romance" was the opening number for The Chromatica Ball, Gaga's 2022 stadium tour, where she performed it from inside a leather sarcophagus-type garment, preceded by Bach's "Fugue No. 24" as the intro, similarly to the song's music video. Nick Levine from NME opined that opening the concert with "Bad Romance", and her previous hit songs—"Poker Face" and "Just Dance"—showed that Gaga had "gumption" and the choice was "clever and daring".

Cover versions
On March 29, 2010, Thirty Seconds to Mars covered the song in BBC Radio 1's Live Lounge, which reached number 11 on the UK Rock Chart. Singer Lissie posted a cover of the song on YouTube, which received praise from filmmaker David Lynch.  The cast of the musical television series Glee performed it on an episode as a group number for which the actors donned Gaga outfits. The song reached number 54 on the Billboard Hot 100 in June 2010. At the 46th Annual Songwriters Hall of Fame Awards, Linda Perry sang the song in a slowed down rendition, before Tony Bennett presented the Contemporary Icon Award to Gaga. "Bad Romance" was briefly played on violin by Geoffrey Rush, portraying Albert Einstein in a promo for the National Geographic Channel historical anthology series Genius. The ad aired during Super Bowl LI immediately after Gaga's halftime performance.

Track listing and formats

Digital download
 "Bad Romance" – 4:54

Digital EP
 "Bad Romance" – 4:54
 "Bad Romance" (Hercules & Love Affair Remix) – 5:11
 "Bad Romance" (Chew Fu Remix) – 7:14
 "Bad Romance" (Starsmith Remix) – 4:55
 "Bad Romance" (Music Video) – 5:14

European CD single
 "Bad Romance" (Radio Edit) – 4:24
 "Bad Romance" (Main) – 4:54

German digital download – remix version
 "Bad Romance" (Radio Edit) – 4:21
 "Bad Romance" (Chew Fu Remix) – 7:13
 "Bad Romance" (Starsmith Remix) – 4:55
 "Bad Romance" (Grum Remix) – 4:50
 "Bad Romance" (Bimbo Jones Radio Remix) – 3:58
 "Bad Romance" (Hercules & Love Affair Remix) – 5:11
 "Bad Romance" (Hercules & Love Affair Dub Remix) – 5:11
 "Bad Romance" (Music Video) – 5:14

US digital EP – The Remixes
 "Bad Romance" (Chew Fu H1N1 Fix) – 7:14
 "Bad Romance" (Kaskade Remix) – 4:20
 "Bad Romance" (Bimbo Jones Radio Remix) – 3:58
 "Bad Romance" (Skrillex Remix) – 4:23

US CD single – The Remixes
 "Bad Romance" (Chew Fu H1N1 Fix) – 7:14
 "Bad Romance" (Kaskade Remix) – 4:20
 "Bad Romance" (Bimbo Jones Remix) – 3:58
 "Bad Romance" (Skrillex Remix) – 4:23
 "Bad Romance" (Grum Remix) – 4:51
 "Bad Romance" (Richard Vission Remix) – 5:23
 "Bad Romance" (Hercules & Love Affair Remix) – 5:12

US digital EP – The Remixes Pt. 2
 "Bad Romance" (Grum Remix) – 4:50
 "Bad Romance" (Richard Vission Remix) – 5:22
 "Bad Romance" (Hercules & Love Affair Remix) – 5:12
 "Bad Romance" (Hercules & Love Affair Dub Remix) – 5:12
 "Bad Romance" (DJ Dan Remix) – 3:44

Personnel
Credits adapted from the liner notes of The Fame Monster.

Recording locations
 Recorded at Record Plant Studios (Los Angeles) and FC Walvisch (Amsterdam)
 Mastered at Oasis Mastering (Burbank, California)

Credits
 Lady Gaga – lead vocals, co-producer, vocal arrangement, background vocals
 Nadir "RedOne" Khayat – producer, vocal editing, vocal arrangement, background vocals, audio engineering, instrumentation, programming, recording
 Johny Severin – vocal editing
 Dave Russell – audio engineering
 Eelco Bakker – audio engineering
 Mark "Spike" Stent – audio mixing
 Gene Grimaldi – audio mastering

Charts

Weekly charts

Year-end charts

Decade-end charts

Certifications and sales

Release history

See also

 List of best-selling singles
 List of best-selling singles in the United States
 List of number-one hits of 2009 (Austria)
 List of Hot 100 number-one singles of 2009 (Canada)
 List of number-one hits in Denmark
 List of number-one singles (Sweden)
 List of number-one singles of 2009 and 2010 (Finland)
 List of number-one hits of 2009 (Italy)
 List of number-one singles of 2009 and 2010 (Ireland)
 List of number-one singles of 2009 and 2010 (UK)
 List of European number-one hits of 2010
 List of number-one hits of 2010 (France)
 List of number-one hits of 2010 (Germany)
 List of number-one singles of 2010 (Hungary)
 List of Romanian Top 100 number ones of the 2010s
 List of number-one dance singles of 2009 (U.S.)
 List of number-one dance singles of 2010 (U.S.)
 List of number-one dance airplay hits of 2010 (U.S.)
 List of Mainstream Top 40 number-one hits of 2010 (U.S.)
 List of number-one singles of 2010 (Spain)
 List of most-viewed YouTube videos

Notes

References

Literary sources

 
 
 
 
 
 
 
 
 
 
 
 

2009 singles
2009 songs
Lady Gaga songs
Canadian Hot 100 number-one singles
European Hot 100 Singles number-one singles
Grammy Award for Best Female Pop Vocal Performance
Grammy Award for Best Short Form Music Video
Cherrytree Records singles
Interscope Records singles
Irish Singles Chart number-one singles
Monitor Latino Top Inglés number-one singles
Macaronic songs
Music videos directed by Francis Lawrence
MTV Video of the Year Award
MTV Video Music Award for Best Female Video
MTV Video Music Award for Best Direction
Number-one singles in Austria
Number-one singles in Denmark
Number-one singles in Finland
SNEP Top Singles number-one singles
Number-one singles in Germany
Number-one singles in Greece
Number-one singles in Hungary
Number-one singles in Iceland
Number-one singles in Israel
Number-one singles in Italy
Number-one singles in Norway
Number-one singles in Romania
Number-one singles in Russia
Number-one singles in Scotland
Number-one singles in Spain
Number-one singles in Sweden
Song recordings produced by Lady Gaga
Song recordings produced by RedOne
Songs written by Lady Gaga
Songs written by RedOne
UK Singles Chart number-one singles
Franglais songs